Romy is a given name. Romy may also refer to:

Kevin Romy (born 1985), Swiss ice hockey player
Romy (TV award), Austrian TV award
ROMY, ICAO code for Miyako Airport
Romy: Anatomy of a Face, a documentary film about Romy Schneider
Romy's Salon, a 2019 Dutch drama film based on the book of the same name by Tamara Bos